Trichophysetis umbrifusalis is a moth in the family Crambidae described by George Hampson in 1912. It is found in India.

References

Cybalomiinae
Moths described in 1912
Moths of Asia